The following is a list of Victoria Cross recipients whose nationality is uncertain.

B
Valentine Bambrick – 1858; Bareilly, India
Guy Hudleston Boisragon – 1891; Nilt Fort, India
Samuel James Browne – 1858; Seerporah, India
Bal Bahadur Gurung – 1914; 2/2 Gurkhas, Nepal

C
George Channer – 1875; Perak, Malaya (now Malaysia)
William St. Lucien Chase – 1880; Deh Khoja, Afghanistan
Herbert Mackworth Clogstoun – 1859; Chichumbah, India
Edmond William Costello – 1897; With the Malakand Field Force
Charles Cowley – 1916; Kut-el-Amara, Mesopotamia

D
John Charles Campbell Daunt – 1857; Chota Behar, India
Collingwood Dickson – 1854; Sebastopol, Crimea
Matthew Charles Dixon – 1855; Sebastopol, Crimea

E
Howard Craufurd Elphinstone – 1855; Sebastopol, Crimea

F
Alfred Kirke Ffrench – 1857; Lucknow, India
Henry Robert Bowreman Foote – 1942; Libya

H
Henry Marshman Havelock – 1857; Cawnpore, India
Frederick William Hedges – 1918; Bousies, France
Edward Elers Delaval Henderson – 1917; River Hai, Mesopotamia

I
Edgar Thomas Inkson – 1900; Colenso, South Africa
Gilbert Stuart Martin Insall – 1915; Achiet, France

J
Hanson Chambers Taylor Jarrett – 1858; Baroun, India
Henry Edward Jerome – 1858; Jhansi, India

K
Robert Kells – 1857; Bolandshahr, India

L
Ian Oswald Liddell – 1945; Lingen, Germany
Frederick Lumsden – 1917; Francilly, France

M

Wilfred St. Aubyn Malleson – 1915; Gallipoli, Turkey
Ross Lowis Mangles – 1857; Arrah, India
Leslie Thomas Manser – 1942; Cologne, Germany
Ian John McKay – 1982; Mount Longdon, Falkland Islands
Valentine Munbee McMaster – 1857; Lucknow, India
Eric Archibald McNair – 1916; Hooge, Belgium
Charles John Melliss – 1900; Obassa, Ashanti (now Ghana)
George Raymond Dallas Moor – 1915; Gallipoli, Turkey

P
Harry Prendergast – 1857; Mundisore, India
Thomas Tannatt Pryce – 1918; Vieux Berquin, France

R
Henry James Raby – 1855; Sebastopol, Crimea
John Neil Randle – 1944; Kohima, India
George Alexander Renny – 1857; Delhi, India
Frederick  Roberts (The Hon.) – 1899; Battle of Colenso, South Africa
Frederick Sleigh Roberts – 1858; Khodagunge, India
George Murray Rolland – 1903; Daratoleh, Somaliland (now Somalia)

S
Euston Henry Sartorius – 1879; Shahjui, Afghanistan
Reginald William Sartorius – 1874; Abogu, Ashanti (now Ghana)
Hugh Shaw – 1865; Nukumaru, New Zealand
John Manners Smith – 1891; Nilt Fort, India

T
Arthur Walderne St Clair Tisdall – 1915; Gallipoli, Turkey
Henry Tombs – 1857; Delhi, India
William Spottiswoode Trevor – 1865; Dewan-Giri, India
John Adam Tytler – 1858; Choorpoorah, India

W
William George Walker – 1903; Daratoleh, Somaliland (now Somalia)
William Francis Frederick Waller – 1858; Gwalior, India
Reginald Alexander John Warneford – 1915; Ghent, Belgium
Thomas Colclough Watson – 1897; Mamund Valley, India
George Campbell Wheeler – 1917; Shumran, Mesopotamia
George Godfrey Massy Wheeler – 1915; Shaiba, Mesopotamia
Wallace Duffield Wright – 1903; Nigeria

Y
Frank Edward Young (VC) – 1918; Havrincourt, France

See also
Wikipedia:WikiProject Victoria Cross Reference Migration